Moritz Graubard (1867 – August 9, 1944) was an American politician from New York. A Democrat, he served as a member of the New York State Assembly for New York County's 8th district from 1908 to 1912 and was a member of the New York City Board of Aldermen for the 2nd district from 1920 to 1931. 

Born in a part of Russia that would become Romania, he came to the United States at the age of 14 and served as Assistant Warden of the Ludlow Street Jail and worked in the office of the Commissioner of Accounts. He was elected to the Assembly in 1907 and would serve in it until defeated by progressive Solomon Sufrin in 1912. He would be elected to the Board of Aldermen in 1919, retiring in 1931. He died in a nursing home on August 9, 1944 and was buried in Mount Carmel Cemetery.

References

New York City Council members
Jewish American state legislators in New York (state)
1944 deaths
Members of the New York State Assembly
American people of Russian-Jewish descent